Ronnie Ray (born January 2, 1954) is an American retired male track and field athlete, who competed in the sprints events during his career. He is best known for winning the men's 400 metres event at the 1975 Pan American Games in Mexico City, Mexico. In that race on 18 October 1975 Ray set his personal best: 44.45.

In 1972, while competing for Homer L. Ferguson High School in Newport News, Virginia, Ray established the National high school record in the 440 yard dash.  High school competition shifted to metric distances in 1980, so the race is now rarely contested.  Ray's time of 45.8 remains the record to this day. There's also 2 different other people with the same name that are famous

External links 

 
 Profile at trackfield.brinkster.net

1954 births
Living people
American male sprinters
Athletes (track and field) at the 1975 Pan American Games
Pan American Games medalists in athletics (track and field)
Pan American Games gold medalists for the United States
Sportspeople from Newport News, Virginia
Track and field athletes from Virginia
African-American male track and field athletes
Medalists at the 1975 Pan American Games
21st-century African-American people
20th-century African-American sportspeople